Jian Ma (Chinese: 马坚) is an American computer scientist and computational biologist. He is the Ray and Stephanie Lane Professor of Computational Biology in the School of Computer Science at Carnegie Mellon University. He is a faculty member in the Computational Biology Department. His lab develops machine learning algorithms to study the structure and function of the human genome. During his Ph.D. and postdoc training, he developed algorithms to reconstruct the ancestral mammalian genome. His research group has recently pioneered a series of new machine learning methods for 3D epigenomics and spatial genomics. He received an NSF CAREER award in 2011. In 2020, he was awarded a Guggenheim Fellowship in Computer Science. He is an elected Fellow of the American Association for the Advancement of Science. He leads an NIH 4D Nucleome Center to develop machine learning algorithms to better understand the cell nucleus.

Recent Publications
 Chidester B, Zhou T, Alam S, and Ma J. SPICEMIX enables integrative single-cell spatial modeling of cell identity. Nature Genetics, 55(1):78-88, 2023. [Cover Article] 
 Zhang R, Zhou T, and Ma J. Ultrafast and interpretable single-cell 3D genome analysis with Fast-Higashi. Cell Systems, 13(10):P798-807.E6, 2022. [Cover Article] 
 Zhu X, Zhang Y, Wang Y, Tian D, Belmont AS, Swedlow JR, and Ma J. Nucleome Browser: An integrative and multimodal data navigation platform for 4D Nucleome. Nature Methods, 19(8):911-913, 2022. 
 Zhang R, Zhou T, and Ma J. Multiscale and integrative single-cell Hi-C analysis with Higashi. Nature Biotechnology, 40:254–261, 2022.
Wang Y, Zhang Y, Zhang R, van Schaik T, Zhang L, Sasaki T, Peric-Hupkes D, Chen Y, Gilbert DM, van Steensel B, Belmont AS, and Ma J. SPIN reveals genome-wide landscape of nuclear compartmentalization. Genome Biology, 22:36, 2021.
Zhang R and Ma J. MATCHA: Probing multi-way chromatin interaction with hypergraph representation learning. Cell Systems, 10(5):397-407.E5, 2020.  
Tian D, Zhang R, Zhang Y, Zhu X, and Ma J. MOCHI enables discovery of heterogeneous interactome modules in 3D nucleome. Genome Research, 30(2):227-238, 2020. [Cover Article]
Zhang R, Zou Y, and Ma J. Hyper-SAGNN: a self-attention based graph neural network for hypergraphs. ICLR, 2020. 
Xiong K and Ma J. Revealing Hi-C subcompartments by imputing inter-chromosomal chromatin interactions. Nature Communications, 10, 5069, 2019.
Yang Y, Zhang Y, Ren B, Dixon J, and Ma J. Comparing 3D genome organization in multiple species using Phylo-HMRF. Cell Systems, 8(6):494-505.e14, 2019. 
Ma J and Duan Z. Replication timing becomes intertwined with 3D genome organization. Cell, 176(4):681-684, 2019 
Yang Y, Gu Q, Zhang Y, Sasaki T, Crivello J, O'Neill R, Gilbert DM, and Ma J. Continuous-trait probabilistic model for comparing multi-species functional genomic data. Cell Systems, 7(2):208-218.e11, 2018.

References

External links 

Jian Ma's publications indexed by Google Scholar

Carnegie Mellon University faculty
University of Illinois faculty
American computer scientists
Machine learning researchers
Computational biologists
Living people
Fellows of the American Association for the Advancement of Science
Year of birth missing (living people)